Joaquin Montañano Chipeco Jr., commonly known as Jun Chipeco, is a Filipino lawyer, politician, public administrator, civic leader, and realtor who last served representative of the Lone District of Calamba. He also served as mayor of Calambafrom 2004 to 2013, representative of the 2nd District of Laguna from 1987 to 1992, 1995 to 2004, and 2013 to 2019, and vice governor of Laguna from 1986 to 1987. He greatly contributed to improving education, health, and infrastructure in his city. During his tenure, the city was chosen as the regional development center of the Calabarzon Region. During his term, the City College of Calamba, the new City Hall of Calamba for Mayor Lajara's term, the Pamilihang Panlungsod ng Calamba and the Calamba Recreational and Institutional Complex were established. He is the second member of the Chipeco family involved in politics.

On July 10, 2020, he is one of the 70 representatives who voted to reject the franchise renewal of ABS-CBN.

References

|-

|-

|-

|-

1942 births
Living people
Lakas–CMD politicians
Mayors of places in Laguna (province)
Members of the House of Representatives of the Philippines from Laguna (province)
People from Calamba, Laguna
Joaquin Jr.
San Beda University alumni
University of Santo Tomas alumni